Patriarch Joannicius I may refer to:

 Joannicius I of Constantinople, Ecumenical Patriarch in 1524–1525
 Patriarch Joannicius of Alexandria, Greek Patriarch of Alexandria 1645–1657